The Campeonato Sergipano is the state football league of Sergipe, Brazil.

Format

 During the 2022 season, The tournament is divided in three stages. In the 1st round, 10 clubs were split in 2 groups of 5 teams in each. The teams played 2 matches against the clubs on the opposite groups, or basically, Group A vs Group B. The top 2 of each group advanced to the semi-finals (second round).

In these semi-finals, the 4 clubs who qualified from the previous round, were distributed in 2 groups of 2 teams in each. The 1st-placed team of each group played against the 2nd-placed team of the same group they took part in, with the teams playing this round in a two-legged match. The best-ranked team would be granted the right to host the 2nd leg.

To determine the winner, the most-common method used in knockout stages is applied. The team with the best goal difference in this round qualified to the final. If this criteria wasn't enough to qualify any of the two teams involved, the best-ranked team in the first round would be crowned the leg winner.

Similarly to the second round, the final was played in a two-legged match, with the best-ranked team (which is, the team with better overall campaign) hosting the second leg. The team with the best goal difference in this round were crowned the champion. If  this criteria wasn't enough to determine the 2022 Campeonato Sergipano champion, the team with the best overall campaign would be crowned the champion.

The 2022 Campeonato Sergipano Final was contested on April 9, 2022. The match was contested by Sergipe and Falcon. The first leg, Falcon hosted the match, that ended 2–1 to Sergipe. The second leg was hosted by who had the best overall campaign prior to the final, Sergipe. The match ended in a 1–1 draw, with Sergipe winning 3–2 on aggregate, and being crowned State League champions for the 37th time in their history, with a 15 title difference from the 2nd team with most championships, Confiança.

Clubs

2022 season

List of champions

Titles by clubs

Teams in bold still active.

By city

See also
 Campeonato Sergipano (lower levels)

References

External links
 FSF Official Website
RSSSF

 
Sergipano